Farkhat Reimbergenovich Bazarov (born 31 January 1980) is a Turkmen former professional football player, who also holds Russian citizenship.

Career 
In 2013 with FC Balkan he won the AFC President's Cup 2013 in Malaysia. From 2015, playing for FC Energetik.

Bazarow made his senior national team debut in 2014 AFC Challenge Cup, match against Philippines.

Achievements 
Nebitçi
 AFC President's Cup: 2013

References

External links

 Career summary by KLISF

1980 births
Living people
Russian footballers
Turkmenistan expatriate footballers
Turkmenistan footballers
Expatriate footballers in Uzbekistan
Turkmenistan expatriate sportspeople in Uzbekistan
Turkmenistan international footballers
Association football goalkeepers
FC Orenburg players